Aleksander Szniolis (13 September 1891 – 6 May 1963) was a Polish architect. His work was part of the architecture event in the art competition at the 1936 Summer Olympics.

References

1891 births
1963 deaths
20th-century Polish architects
Olympic competitors in art competitions
Architects from Vilnius